Elachista planicara is a moth in the family Elachistidae. It was described by Lauri Kaila in 1998. It is found in Japan (Hokkaidô, Honsyû, Sikoku, Kyûsyû) and the Russian Far East (Kuriles).

The length of the forewings is 4–5.2 mm for males and 4–5 mm for females. Adults are similar to Elachista sasae, but are more slender winged and lighter in colour. Adults have been recorded on wing in early July.

The larvae feed on Sasa, Sasamorpha and Pleioblastus species and possibly Carex morrowii. They mine the leaves of their host plant. The autumn mine is wavy-linear. After hibernation, the mine becomes a blotch. Larvae can be found from late September to May.

References

Moths described in 1998
planicara
Moths of Japan
Moths of Asia